is a sub-temple of Daitoku-ji, Kyoto, Japan. It was founded by Hosokawa Tadaoki. There is a teahouse, the Shōkō-ken, and the gardens are celebrated for their momiji. A pair of Southern Song monochrome hanging scrolls with landscape have been designated a National Treasure. Many other works are aired annually in October.

See also

Daitoku-ji
List of National Treasures of Japan (paintings)

External links
 Pictures of Kōtō-in

References

Buddhist temples in Kyoto
Daitoku-ji temples
Daitoku-ji